The Bachelor, also known as The Bachelor: Em Busca do Grande Amor (English: The Bachelor: In Search of Great Love) was a Brazilian reality television series, based on the American television series of the same name, which premiered November 21, 2014 on RedeTV!. The show features 44-year-old Italian businessman, Gianluca Perino, courting 25 women.

The series concluded on February 20, 2015 in which 28-year-old gastronomy student Aane Doux was named the winner. However, the couple  announced their break up four months after the show aired.

On July 31, 2017, Aane revealed that the entire show was a lie and she and Gianluca were never in a real relationship as he already had a girlfriend during the entire time of filming. She also announced that she was suing RedeTV! claiming that they had not fulfilled her contract, which provided that the winner of The Bachelor would be hired for a year to be a presenter or reporter for the network.

Contestants
Biographical information according to RedeTV! official series site, plus footnoted additions.

Call-out order

Key

Ratings and reception

Brazilian ratings
All numbers are in points and provided by Kantar Ibope Media.

See also
 List of programs broadcast by RedeTV!

References

External links
 Official website

2014 Brazilian television series debuts
2015 Brazilian television series endings
Brazilian reality television series
RedeTV! original programming
Brazilian TV series
Brazilian television series based on American television series
Television shows filmed in São Paulo (state)